Inger Smuk (born 4 April 1947) is a Norwegian politician for the Centre Party.

She served as a deputy representative to the Norwegian Parliament from Finnmark during the term 1993–1997. In total she met during 17 days of parliamentary session.

References

1947 births
Living people
Deputy members of the Storting
Centre Party (Norway) politicians
Finnmark politicians
Norwegian Sámi politicians
Place of birth missing (living people)
20th-century Norwegian women politicians
20th-century Norwegian politicians
Women members of the Storting